Oreta rubromarginata is a moth in the family Drepanidae. It was described by Charles Swinhoe in 1902. It is found on Borneo and Sumatra.

The forewings are yellow with a broad marginal chestnut-red band. The hindwings are yellow in the interior part and the chestnut-red band is very deep, occupying nearly one-third of the wings. There is a large chestnut-red patch with four or five angulated projections in the middle of the wing.

References

Moths described in 1902
Drepaninae